Capital punishment in Abkhazia is only permitted for crimes during wartime, although the country is considered to be abolitionist. Since 2007, a moratorium on the death penalty had been in place. In prior years, Abkhazia sentenced ten people to death for various offenses, but none of those sentences were carried out.

References

Capital punishment